Thomas Gorges, D.D. (13 February 160312 December 1667) was  an English priest in the 17th century.

Reniger was born in Wraxall, Somerset and educated at The Queen's College, Oxford He became a Fellow of All Souls College, Oxford in 1629.  He became Archdeacon of Winchester and a Canon of Westminster in 1661, holding both positions until his death.

Notes

1603 births
1667 deaths
People from Somerset
Archdeacons of Winchester (ancient)
Alumni of The Queen's College, Oxford